Jub Khaleh-ye Olya (also Romanized as Jūb Khaleh-ye ‘Olyā and Jūbkhaleh-ye ‘Olyā; also known as Chūy Qal‘eh, Jub Khaleh, Jūbkhāleh-ye Bālā, Jūb Khaleh-ye Bālā, Jūkheleh, and Jūy Khaleh Bālā) is a village in Komehr Rural District, in the Central District of Sepidan County, Fars Province, Iran. At the 2006 census, its population was 120, in 25 families.

References 

Populated places in Sepidan County